The Sheriff's Secret is a 1931 American Western film directed by James P. Hogan and starring Jack Perrin, Dorothy Bauer and Fred Hargreaves.

Cast
 Jack Perrin as Jack Rawlins 
 Dorothy Bauer as Alice 
 Fred Hargreaves as Bill 
 Joe Smith Marba as Sheriff 
 Jimmy Aubrey
 Billy Franey
 George Chesebro
 Monte Jones

Plot
Outlaw Rawlins. accompanied by a child (Bill), avoids a sheriff's posse by heading into a desert. The boy becomes ill, causing Rawilins to take a doctor from town out to treat him. With the help of a girl (Alice), Rawlins turns himself in to the sheriff. Bill and Alice promise to wait for him until his sentence is completed.

References

Bibliography
 Michael R. Pitts. Poverty Row Studios, 1929–1940: An Illustrated History of 55 Independent Film Companies, with a Filmography for Each. McFarland & Company, 2005.

External links
 

1931 films
1931 Western (genre) films
1930s English-language films
American Western (genre) films
Films directed by James Patrick Hogan
1930s American films